Water channel may refer to:
 Strait, a naturally formed, narrow waterway
 Channel (geography), a landform consisting of the outline of the path of a narrow body of water
 Canal, a man-made channel for water
 Water Channel, a former TV channel in the United States
 Aquaporin, a cellular membrane structure that selectively passes water 
 An experimental tank
 Ship model basin, used in naval architecture to study the behaviour of sea vessels
 Water tunnel (hydrodynamic), used to study hydraulic flow
 Wave tank, a laboratory setup for observing the behavior of surface waves (also called: wave flume)
 Ripple tank, a shallow glass tank of water used in schools and colleges to demonstrate the basic properties of waves